Calvin Rudolph Medley (July 27, 1923 – October 13, 1983), nicknamed "Babe", was an American Negro league pitcher in the 1940s.

A native of Washington, DC, Medley served in the US Marines during World War II. In two recorded appearances with the New York Black Yankees in 1946, he allowed seven earned runs in one inning of work on the mound. Medley died in Washington, DC in 1983 at age 60.

References

External links
 and Seamheads

1923 births
1983 deaths
New York Black Yankees players
United States Marine Corps personnel of World War II
African Americans in World War II
African-American United States Navy personnel